Vsevolod Petrovich Zaderatsky (21 December 1891, Rivne, Russian Empire 1 February 1953, Lvov, USSR) was a Russian Imperial and Ukrainian Soviet composer, pianist and teacher at Lysenko Musical Academy who was blacklisted for most of his life because of his participation in the White movement during the Russian Civil War.

Life
Zaderatsky was born in Rivne, Volhynian Governorate, Russian Empire (present-day Ukraine) 21 December 1891 in the family of a Russian Imperial railway official. His family moved to Kursk while he was a child. He studied music at the Moscow Conservatory, being drafted in 1916 and fighting in World War I, from 1918–1920 in the army of Anton Denikin (see: South Russia (1919–1920)). After the war he continued his studies under Mikhail Ippolitov-Ivanov, graduating from the conservatory in 1923. From the mid-1920s began performing as a pianist, giving many solo concerts, and performing together with the famous bass Grigory Pirogov.

In 1926 he was arrested as a member of Monarchist movement and sent to Ryazan prison, and all his compositions were destroyed. In 1929 he received permission to live and work in Moscow, and in 1930 he gained the position of composer at All-Union Radio. While in Moscow Zaderatsky joined the Association for Contemporary Music (ACM) just as the rival group, the Russian Association of Proletarian Musicians (RAPM) was rising to ascendancy and the Terror (Yezhovshchina) escalating. In 1932 the members of the ACM were suppressed. In 1934 he was sent to Yaroslavl, where in March 1937 he was arrested. In July 1939 he was released from the Sevvostlag and in early 1940 was back in Yaroslavl.

At the beginning of World War II he was evacuated with his family to the city of Merke (Kazakhstan). From 1945 he lived in Zhytomyr, then returned to Yaroslavl, and was a delegate to the first Congress of Soviet Composers in 1948. From 1949 till the end of his life, he lived in Lviv and worked at Lysenko Musical Academy.

Family
His son, Vsevolod Vsevolodovich Zaderatsky (Всеволод Всеволодович Задерацкий, born 1935), is a professor of the Moscow Conservatory.

Selected recordings
 Preludes Shostakovich, Zaderatsky: Jascha Nemtsov. Profil.
 Songs - Zaderatsky, Arthur Lourié, Shostakovich. Verena Rein. Jascha Nemtsov. Profil
 24 Preludes & Fugues (2 CDs): Jascha Nemtsov. Profil.
 Anthology ″Legends″. 5 CDs with piano compositions by Zaderatsky: 24 Preludes & Fugues, cycles Homeland and Front, 24 Preludes, cycles The Album of Miniatures, Porcelain Cups, Microbes of the lyric and Legends, Sonatas No. 1 and 2, Sonata in F minor. Jascha Nemtsov. Hänssler Classic.

References

External links

Links in Russian:
 IATP Ukraine
 Pdf (Russian) of the Moscow Conservatory
 Russian Forum
 Composer Zaderetsky (Russian)

1891 births
1953 deaths
Russian composers
Russian male composers
Ukrainian composers
Ukrainian music educators
Academic staff of Lviv Conservatory
Musicians from Rivne
Moscow Conservatory alumni
Russian military personnel of World War I
20th-century composers
20th-century Russian male musicians